Infection and Immunity is a peer-reviewed medical journal published by the American Society for Microbiology. It focuses on interactions between bacterial, fungal, or parasitic pathogens and their hosts. Areas covered include molecular pathogenesis, cellular microbiology, bacterial infection, host responses and inflammation, fungal and parasitic infections, microbial immunity and vaccines, and molecular genomics. The journal publishes primary research articles, editorials, commentaries, minireviews, and a spotlight report highlighting articles of particular interest selected by the editors. Articles are freely accessible after 6 months (delayed open access). Through its "Global Outreach Program," free online access is available to qualified microbiologists in eligible developing countries.

History 
The journal was established in 1970. Prior to that time, original research articles covering topics in infection and immunity were published in a section of the Journal of Bacteriology. As the size of this section grew, the need for a separate journal publishing peer-reviewed research in this area became apparent. The first editor-in-chief was Erwin Neter (SUNY Buffalo).

Editors-in-chief 
The following persons have been editor-in-chief of Infection and Immunity:
 1970-1979: Erwin Neter
 1980-1989: Joseph W. Shands, Jr.
 1990-1999: Vincent A. Fischetti
 2000-2007: Alison D. O’Brien
 2007–2017: Ferric C. Fang
 2017–present: Andreas J. Bäumler

Abstracting and indexing 
The journal is abstracted and indexed in:

According to the Journal Citation Reports, the journal has a 2017 impact factor of 3.256, ranking it 30th out of 88 journals in the category "Infectious Diseases" and 75th out of 155 journals in the category "Immunology."

References

External links 
 

Microbiology journals
Delayed open access journals
Publications established in 1970
English-language journals
Monthly journals
American Society for Microbiology academic journals